天涯歌女 may refer to:

 "The Wandering Songstress", a song sung first by Zhou Xuan
 Song Bird (TV series), a Hong Kong television series
 Street Angel (1937 film), a Chinese film

zh:天涯歌女